Alexander Dartsch (born 29 August 1994) is a German footballer who plays as a midfielder for VFC Plauen.

References

1994 births
People from Rochlitz
Footballers from Saxony
Living people
German footballers
Association football midfielders
FC Erzgebirge Aue players
Chemnitzer FC players
SV Eintracht Trier 05 players
ZFC Meuselwitz players
VFC Plauen players
2. Bundesliga players
3. Liga players
Regionalliga players
Oberliga (football) players